Hinemoa is  a popular female Māori given name, often shortened to Hine. It is particularly associated with Hinemoa and Tutanekai, a Māori legend about a couple kept apart. Other people with the name include:

 Hinemoa Elder, New Zealand youth forensic psychiatrist

The name can also refer to:

Films
Hinemoa (1913 film), a silent film made in New Zealand (1913) by Gaston Méliès
Hinemoa (1914 film), a silent film made in New Zealand (1914) by George Tarr
The Romance of Hine-moa, a silent film made in New Zealand (1927) by Gustav Pauli

Snails
Hinemoa (gastropod), a genus of small sea snails
Hinemoa forticingulata, a species of sea snail
Hinemoa indica, a species of sea snail
Hinemoa punicea, a species of sea snailPlacostylus ambagiosus hinemoa, an extinct subspecies of very large, air-breathing land snail Cantharidus antipoda hinemoa'', a subspecies of sea snail

Other
Hinemoa Planitia, a plain on the planet Venus
NZGSS Hinemoa, a New Zealand government steamer